Chasing Mummies: The Amazing Adventures of Zahi Hawass is a reality television series that aired on The History Channel in the United States. Produced by Boutique TV, the series depicted the adventures of archaeologist and Egyptologist Dr. Zahi Hawass and his discoveries in Egypt as he is followed by young archeological fellows and a camera crew. The series ran Wednesdays on the History Channel from July 14, 2010 until its end on September 15, 2010. The shows illustrates the complexities in the almost never-ending quest to preserve and discover artifacts from ancient Egypt.

Cast
Dr. Zahi Hawass is an eminent archaeologist who was Egypt's Vice Minister of Culture. In 1987, he received his Doctoral Degree (Ph.D) from the University of Pennsylvania, where he studied as a Fulbright Fellow. He has served as Chief Inspector of the Giza Pyramid Plateau. In 1998, he was appointed as director of the Giza Plateau. In 2002 he was appointed Secretary General of the Egyptian Supreme Council of Antiquities. Hawass has been accused of self-promotion, and has made controversial statements about Jews and what he has described as Jewish "control" of the world.
 Leslie Greif is an executive producer of the show and frequently appears on camera. He has worked in various movie and television projects for the past 25 years. He produced and co-created Walker, Texas Ranger, starring Chuck Norris, and directed documentaries on Steve McQueen and Marlon Brando. His feature film credits include Funny Money, starring Chevy Chase, and Keys to Tulsa.
Dr. Allan Morton is fellowship coordinator. He has been an archaeologist for twenty years, and holds a Ph.D from Cambridge University.
David Cheetham is a consulting archaeologist. He has been an archaeologist for two decades, and has conducted research in the countries of Guatemala, Belize, and Mexico.

Archaeological fellows
Zoë D'Amato is an actress who has studied anthropology and art history at McGill University. She has worked as a librarian, an English teacher, bartender, and fundraiser for Greenpeace.
Alice Robinson is a curator at the British Museum and archaeological researcher. She holds a master's degree in archaeology and anthropology from Oxford University.
Derek Lincoln has an undergraduate degree in history and anthropology from the University of South Florida and a master's degree in Mediterranean archaeology from Bristol University.
Lindsay Tanner has a degree in acting and anthropology from New York University.

Reception

Chasing Mummies has been largely panned by critics, who write that Hawass is unlikeable and that the show is not an authentic documentary series. Summarizing the show, New York Times columnist Neil Genzlinger writes, "[O]ne hopes that this show will, like some of those ancient pharaohs, die young, or that Dr. Hawass will unearth some ancient Egyptian chill pills and swallow a generous helping." He said that a segment showing an intern locked in a pyramid did not seem genuine, and that the show is "intent on forcing drama into the proceedings in a way that seems artificial." According to Genzlinger, due to the comedic nature of many of the interactions depicted, it is not hard to speculate that Dr. Hawass, the producer, and cast are filming what turns out to be a running inside joke between themselves.

TVGA describes the show as "a reality series in the tradition of Bravo's Flipping Out. Like egomaniacal but essentially harmless blowhard Jeff Lewis, Zahi Hawass...is set up to be the comically abusive centerpiece of the show." Referring to an "intern" on the show, TVGA said, "If Zoe's not an actress and this show [is] not severely engineered / scripted, I'd both be surprised and deeply curious about how the hell Chasing Mummies could look this level of manipulated and artificial." The Egyptian daily Almasry Alyoum called that incident a "rather obvious bit of staged drama," and said that Hawass "is shown berating underlings in both English and Arabic, talking about himself in the third person and generally acting like a bit of a cartoon." The newspaper said Chasing Mummies "often verges on self-parody."

Episodes

References

External links
 
 
 Zahi Hawass' website
 Zoe D'Amato's website

2010 American television series debuts
2010s American reality television series
2010 American television series endings
Archaeology of Egypt
Egyptology
History (American TV channel) original programming